Miyaura borylation, also known as the Miyaura borylation reaction, is a named reaction in organic chemistry that allows for the generation of boronates from vinyl or aryl halides with the cross-coupling of bis(pinacolato)diboron in basic conditions with a catalyst such as PdCl2(dppf). The resulting borylated products can be used as coupling partners for the Suzuki reaction.

Scope
The Miyaura borylation has shown to work for:

Alkyl halides, aryl halides, aryl halides using tetrahydroxydiboron, aryl halides using bis-boronic acid, aryl triflates, aryl mesylates, vinyl halides, vinyl halides of α,β-unsaturated carbonyl compounds, and vinyl triflates.

See also
 Chan-Lam coupling
 Heck reaction
 Hiyama coupling
 Kumada coupling
 Negishi coupling
 Petasis reaction
 Sonogashira coupling
 Stille reaction
 Suzuki reaction
 List of organic reactions

References

Name reactions